Sagittaria papillosa, the nipplebract arrowhead, is a plant species native to the south-central United States (Texas, Oklahoma, Louisiana, Arkansas and Mississippi).

Sagittaria papillosa grows in wet places such as marshes and the banks of lakes and slow-moving streams. It is a perennial herb up to 120 cm tall. Petioles are triangular in cross-section, the leaf blade very narrowly elliptical to ovate, not lobed. The species is distinguished from others in the genus by having bumps (papillae) resembling nipples on the flower bracts.

References

papillosa
Flora of the Southern United States
Freshwater plants
Edible plants
Plants described in 1868